The 1975 NAIA men's basketball tournament was held in March at Kemper Arena in Kansas City, Missouri. The 38th annual NAIA basketball tournament featured 32 teams playing in a single-elimination format. This would be the first tournament played in Kemper Arena.

Awards and honors
Leading scorer: John McGill, Alcorn State (Miss.)
Leading rebounder:
Player of the Year: est. 1994

1975 NAIA bracket

Third-place game
The third-place game featured the losing teams from the national semifinalist to determine 3rd and 4th places in the tournament. This game was played until 1988. This particular Consolation Game between Alcorn State and St. Mary's was  rematch of a 1974 Semifinal game (Alcorn State won both games).

See also
1975 NCAA Division I men's basketball tournament
1975 NCAA Division II men's basketball tournament
1975 NCAA Division III men's basketball tournament

References

NAIA Men's Basketball Championship
Tournament
NAIA men's basketball tournament
NAIA men's basketball tournament
College basketball tournaments in Missouri
Basketball competitions in Kansas City, Missouri